is a former Japanese voice actress. She was born in Tokyo, and retired from voice acting in 2001; her final role was that of Maron Kusakabe's mother: Koron Kusakabe in Kamikaze Kaitou Jeanne.

Filmography
Adieu Galaxy Express 999 as Kei Yuki
Ai Shite Knight as Meiko Kajiwara
Asari-chan as Hamano Tatami
Candy Candy as Patricia O'Brien
Candy Candy the Movie as Sister Lane
Cat's Eye as Kazumi
Greed (OVA) as Iko
Invincible Super Man Zambot 3 as Hanae Jin, Kazuyuki Kamie and Aki 
Kaibutsu-kun as Utako
Kamikaze Kaito Jeanne as Koron Kusakabe (only seen in flashbacks and this was her last role before she retired)
Kimagure Orange Road as Hikaru's mother
Kiteretsu Daihyakka as Yoshie Sakurai
Please Save My Earth as Rin Kobayashi's mother
Policenauts as Lorraine Hōjō and Chris Goldwin
Sailor Moon as Sailor Pluto, Haruna Sakurada and Shingo Tsukino, Derella (episode 7), Utonberino (episode 55), Yamandakka (episode 58)
Sailor Moon S: The Movie as Sailor Pluto
Sailor Moon Super S: The Movie as Sailor Pluto
Saint Seiya as Geist and young Shiryu
Space Pirate Captain Harlock as Kei Yuki and Mayu 
Stop!! Hibari-kun! as Hiromi Iwasaki
Tiger Mask II as Midori Ariyoshi
UFO Robo Grendizer as Hikaru Makiba
Yawara! as Fujiko Itou

External links
 
 

1954 births
Living people
Voice actresses from Tokyo
Japanese video game actresses
Japanese voice actresses
20th-century Japanese actresses
21st-century Japanese actresses
Aoni Production voice actors